Roy Stabb (30 November 1922 – 29 December 2010) was  a former Australian rules footballer who played with Collingwood and Melbourne in the Victorian Football League (VFL). Roy was non-playing coach of the Commonwealth Bank Football Club for 10 years, in the VAFA  following H.W.Heathershaw and C.J.Weale.

Notes

External links 

1922 births
2010 deaths
Australian rules footballers from Victoria (Australia)
Collingwood Football Club players
Melbourne Football Club players